Trolley Gallery is a contemporary art gallery in Shoreditch, east London, which emerged independently and alongside the already established Trolley Books in 2003.  The gallery exhibits the work of new, emerging artists and is often host to first solo shows.  The gallery's directors were Hannah Watson and founder Gigi Giannuzzi, who died in 2013.

Trolley Gallery took part in the Zoo Art Fair 2004, 2005, 2006 and 2007.

References

External links 
 Trolley Gallery Exhibitions

Contemporary art galleries in London
Buildings and structures in the London Borough of Hackney
Tourist attractions in the London Borough of Hackney
Photography museums and galleries in England
Art galleries established in 2003
2003 establishments in England
Shoreditch